The 17th United States Congress was a meeting of the legislative branch of the United States federal government, consisting of the United States Senate and the United States House of Representatives. While its term was officially March 4, 1821, to March 4, 1823, during the fifth and sixth years of James Monroe's presidency, its first session began on December 3, 1821, ending on May 8, 1822, and its second session began on  December 2, 1822, to March 3, 1823.  The apportionment of seats in the House of Representatives was based on the 1810 United States census. Both chambers had a Democratic-Republican majority.

The members William Smith, John Gaillard, Joseph Gist, John Wilson, George McDuffie, Starling Tucker, James Overstreet, Thomas R. Mitchell, William Lowndes,  Joel Roberts Poinsett, and James Blair were described as being "outspokenly pro-British" in their outlook.  All of whom signed a "letter of brotherhood and solidarity" addressed to British Prime Minister Robert Jenkinson, 2nd Earl of Liverpool and the British Secretary of State for Foreign Affairs Robert Stewart, Viscount Castlereagh in 1822.  The same letter harshly condemned the actions of France and specifically those of King Louis XVIII.

Major events

 March 5, 1821: Second inauguration of James Monroe as President of the United States.
 July 10, 1821: In accordance with the terms of the 1819 Adams–Onís Treaty, sovereignty over Spanish Florida is officially transferred to the United States from Spain.
 December 3–4, 1821: The election for the House speakership takes 12 ballots.

Major legislation

States admitted and territories organized 
 August 10, 1821: Missouri was admitted as the 24th U.S. state
 March 30, 1822: Florida Territory was formed from the lands ceded by Spain known by the name East and West Florida

Party summary
The count below identifies party affiliations at the beginning of the first session of this congress. Changes resulting from subsequent replacements are shown below in the "Changes in membership" section.

Senate 
During this congress, two Senate seats were added for the new state of Missouri.

House of Representatives 
For the beginning of this congress, six seats from Massachusetts were reapportioned to the new state of Maine (one seat had already moved during the previous congress), . During this congress, one House seat was added for the new state of Missouri, .

Leadership

Senate 
 President: Daniel D. Tompkins (DR)
 President pro tempore: John Gaillard (DR), elected December 3, 1821

House of Representatives 
 Speaker: Philip P. Barbour (DR), elected December 4, 1821, on the 12th ballot

Members
This list is arranged by chamber, then by state. Senators are listed by class, and representatives are listed by district.
Skip to House of Representatives, below

Senate
Senators were elected by the state legislatures every two years, with one-third beginning new six-year terms with each Congress. Preceding the names in the list below are Senate class numbers, which indicate the cycle of their election. In this Congress, Class 1 meant their term began with this Congress, requiring reelection in 1826; Class 2 meant their term ended with this Congress, requiring reelection in 1822; and Class 3 meant their term began in the last Congress, requiring reelection in 1824.

Alabama 
 2. William R. King (DR)
 3. John W. Walker (DR), until December 12, 1822
 William Kelly (DR), from December 12, 1822

Connecticut 
 1. Elijah Boardman (DR)
 3. James Lanman (DR)

Delaware 
 1. Caesar A. Rodney (DR), January 24, 1822 – January 29, 1823, vacant for remainder of term
 2. Nicholas Van Dyke (F)

Georgia 
 2. Freeman Walker (DR), until August 6, 1821
 Nicholas Ware (DR), from November 10, 1821
 3. John Elliott (DR)

Illinois 
 2. Jesse B. Thomas (DR)
 3. Ninian Edwards (DR)

Indiana 
 1. James Noble (DR)
 3. Waller Taylor (DR)

Kentucky 
 2. Richard M. Johnson (DR)
 3. Isham Talbot (DR)

Louisiana 
 2. Henry Johnson (DR)
 3. James Brown (DR)

Maine 
 1. John Holmes (DR)
 2. John Chandler (DR)

Maryland 
 1. William Pinkney (DR), until February 25, 1822 
 Samuel Smith (DR), from December 17, 1822
 3. Edward Lloyd (DR)

Massachusetts 
 1. Elijah H. Mills (F)
 2. Harrison Gray Otis (F), until May 30, 1822
 James Lloyd (F), from June 5, 1822

Mississippi 
 1. David Holmes (DR)
 2. Thomas H. Williams (DR)

Missouri 
 1. Thomas H. Benton (DR), from August 10, 1821 (newly admitted state)
 3. David Barton (DR), from August 10, 1821 (newly admitted state)

New Hampshire 
 2. David L. Morril (DR)
 3. John F. Parrott (DR)

New Jersey 
 1. Samuel L. Southard (DR)
 2. Mahlon Dickerson (DR)

New York 
 1. Martin Van Buren (DR)
 3. Rufus King (F)

North Carolina 
 2. Montfort Stokes (DR)
 3. Nathaniel Macon (DR)

Ohio 
 1. Benjamin Ruggles (DR)
 3. William A. Trimble (DR), until December 13, 1821
 Ethan Allen Brown (DR), from January 3, 1822

Pennsylvania 
 1. William Findlay (DR), from December 10, 1821
 3. Walter Lowrie (DR)

Rhode Island 
 1. James DeWolf (DR)
 2. Nehemiah R. Knight (DR)

South Carolina 
 2. William Smith (DR)
 3. John Gaillard (DR)

Tennessee 
 1. John H. Eaton (DR), from September 27, 1821
 2. John Williams (DR)

Vermont 
 1. Horatio Seymour (DR)
 3. William A. Palmer (DR)

Virginia 
 1. James Barbour (DR)
 2. James Pleasants (DR), until December 15, 1822
 John Taylor of Caroline (DR), from December 18, 1822

House of Representatives
The names of members of the House of Representatives are preceded by their district numbers.

Alabama 
 . Gabriel Moore (DR)

Connecticut 
All representatives were elected statewide on a general ticket.
 . Noyes Barber (DR)
 . Daniel Burrows (DR)
 . Henry W. Edwards (DR)
 . John Russ (DR)
 . Ansel Sterling (DR)
 . Ebenezer Stoddard (DR)
 . Gideon Tomlinson (DR)

Delaware 
Both representatives were elected statewide on a general ticket.
 . Louis McLane (F)
 . Caesar A. Rodney (DR), until January 24, 1822
 Daniel Rodney (F), from October 1, 1822

Georgia 
All representatives were elected statewide on a general ticket.
 . Joel Abbot (DR)
 . Alfred Cuthbert (DR)
 . George R. Gilmer (DR)
 . Robert R. Reid (DR)
 . Edward F. Tattnall (DR)
 . Wiley Thompson (DR)

Illinois 
 . Daniel P. Cook (DR)

Indiana 
 . William Hendricks (DR), until July 25, 1822
 Jonathan Jennings (DR), from December 2, 1822

Kentucky 
 . David Trimble (DR)
 . Samuel H. Woodson (DR)
 . John T. Johnson (DR)
 . Thomas Metcalfe (DR)
 . Anthony New (DR)
 . Francis Johnson (DR)
 . George Robertson (DR), until sometime in 1821 before the convening of Congress
 John S. Smith (DR), from August 6, 1821
 . Wingfield Bullock (DR), until October 13, 1821
 James D. Breckinridge (DR), from November 21, 1821
 . Thomas Montgomery (DR)
 . Benjamin Hardin (DR)

Louisiana 
 . Josiah S. Johnston (DR)

Maine 
 . Joseph Dane (F)
 . Ezekiel Whitman (F), until June 1, 1822
 Mark Harris (DR), from December 2, 1822
 . Mark L. Hill (DR)
 . William D. Williamson (DR)
 . Ebenezer Herrick (DR)
 . Joshua Cushman (DR)
 . Enoch Lincoln (DR)

Maryland 
The 5th district was a plural district with two representatives.
 . Raphael Neale (F)
 . Joseph Kent (DR)
 . Henry R. Warfield (F)
 . John Nelson (DR)
 . Peter Little (DR)
 . Samuel Smith (DR), until December 17, 1822
 Isaac McKim (DR), from January 4, 1823
 . Jeremiah Cosden (DR), until March 19, 1822
 Philip Reed (DR), from March 19, 1822
 . Robert Wright (DR)
 . Thomas Bayly (F)

Massachusetts 
 . Benjamin Gorham (DR)
 . Gideon Barstow (DR)
 . Jeremiah Nelson (F)
 . Timothy Fuller (DR)
 . Samuel Lathrop (F)
 . Samuel C. Allen (F)
 . Henry W. Dwight (F)
 . Aaron Hobart (DR)
 . John Reed Jr. (F)
 . Francis Baylies (F)
 . Jonathan Russell (DR)
 . Lewis Bigelow (F)
 . William Eustis (DR)

Mississippi 
 . Christopher Rankin (DR)

Missouri 
 . John Scott (DR), from August 10, 1821 (newly admitted state)

New Hampshire 
All representatives were elected statewide on a general ticket.
 . Josiah Butler (DR)
 . Matthew Harvey (DR)
 . Aaron Matson (DR)
 . William Plumer Jr. (DR)
 . Nathaniel Upham (DR)
 . Thomas Whipple Jr. (DR)

New Jersey 
All representatives were elected statewide on a general ticket.
 . Ephraim Bateman (DR)
 . George Cassedy (DR)
 . Lewis Condict (DR)
 . George Holcombe (DR)
 . James Matlack (DR)
 . Samuel Swan (DR)

New York 
There were five plural districts: the 1st, 2nd, 12th, 15th & 20th each had two representatives.
 . Cadwallader D. Colden (F), from December 12, 1821
 . Silas Wood (F)
 . Churchill C. Cambreleng (DR)
 . John J. Morgan (DR)
 . Jeremiah H. Pierson (DR)
 . William W. Van Wyck (DR)
 . Walter Patterson (F)
 . Selah Tuthill (DR), until September 7, 1821
 Charles Borland Jr. (DR), from December 3, 1821
 . Charles H. Ruggles (F)
 . Richard McCarty (DR)
 . Solomon Van Rensselaer (F), until January 14, 1822
 Stephen Van Rensselaer (F), from March 12, 1822
 . John D. Dickinson (F)
 . John W. Taylor (DR)
 . Nathaniel Pitcher (DR)
 . Reuben H. Walworth (DR)
 . John Gebhard (DR)
 . Alfred Conkling (DR)
 . Samuel Campbell (DR)
 . James Hawkes (DR)
 . Joseph Kirkland (F)
 . Thomas H. Hubbard (DR)
 . Micah Sterling (F)
 . Elisha Litchfield (DR)
 . William B. Rochester (DR)
 . David Woodcock (DR)
 . Elijah Spencer (DR)
 . Albert H. Tracy (DR)

North Carolina 
 . Lemuel Sawyer (DR)
 . Hutchins G. Burton (DR)
 . Thomas H. Hall (DR)
 . William S. Blackledge (DR)
 . Charles Hooks (DR)
 . Weldon N. Edwards (DR)
 . Archibald McNeill (F)
 . Josiah Crudup (DR)
 . Romulus M. Saunders (DR)
 . John Long (DR)
 . Henry W. Connor (DR)
 . Felix Walker (DR)
 . Lewis Williams (DR)

Ohio 
 . Thomas R. Ross (DR)
 . John W. Campbell (DR)
 . Levi Barber (DR)
 . David Chambers (DR), from October 9, 1821
 . Joseph Vance (DR)
 . John Sloane (DR)

Pennsylvania 
There were six plural districts: the 2nd, 3rd, 5th, 6th & 10th had two representatives each, and the 1st had four representatives.
 . Samuel Edwards (F)
 . Joseph Hemphill (F)
 . William Milnor (F), until May 8, 1822
 Thomas Forrest (F), from October 8, 1822
 . John Sergeant (F)
 . William Darlington (DR)
 . Samuel Gross (DR)
 . James Buchanan (F)
 . John Phillips (F)
 . James S. Mitchell (DR)
 . John Findlay (DR), from October 9, 1821
 . James McSherry (F)
 . Samuel Moore (DR), until May 20, 1822
 Samuel D. Ingham (DR), from October 8, 1822
 . Thomas J. Rogers (DR)
 . Ludwig Worman (F), until October 17, 1822
 Daniel Udree (DR), from October 17, 1822
 . John Tod (DR)
 . John Brown (DR)
 . George Denison (DR)
 .  Thomas Murray Jr. (DR), from October 9, 1821
 . George Plumer (DR)
 . Thomas Patterson (DR)
 . Andrew Stewart (DR)
 . Henry Baldwin (DR), until May 8, 1822
 Walter Forward (DR), from October 8, 1822
 . Patrick Farrelly (DR)

Rhode Island 
Both representatives were elected statewide on a general ticket.
 . Job Durfee (DR)
 . Samuel Eddy (DR)

South Carolina 
 . Joel R. Poinsett (DR)
 . William Lowndes (DR), until May 8, 1822
 James Hamilton Jr. (DR), from December 13, 1822
 . Thomas R. Mitchell (DR)
 . James Overstreet (DR), until May 24, 1822
 Andrew R. Govan (DR), from December 4, 1822
 . Starling Tucker (DR)
 . George McDuffie (DR)
 . John Wilson (DR)
 . Joseph Gist (DR)
 . James Blair (DR), until May 8, 1822
 John Carter (DR), from December 11, 1822

Tennessee 
 . John Rhea (DR)
 . John Cocke (DR)
 . Francis Jones (DR)
 . Robert Allen (DR)
 . Newton Cannon (DR)
 . Vacant

Vermont 
 . Rollin C. Mallary (DR)
 . Phineas White (DR)
 . Charles Rich (DR)
 . Elias Keyes (DR)
 . Samuel C. Crafts (DR)
 . John Mattocks (DR)

Virginia 
 . Edward B. Jackson (DR)
 . Thomas Van Swearingen (F), until August 19, 1822
 James Stephenson (F), from October 28, 1822
 . Jared Williams (DR)
 . William McCoy (DR)
 . John Floyd (DR)
 . Alexander Smyth (DR)
 . William Smith (DR)
 . Charles F. Mercer (F)
 . William Lee Ball (DR)
 . Thomas L. Moore (DR)
 . Philip P. Barbour (DR)
 . Robert S. Garnett (DR)
 . Burwell Bassett (DR)
 . Jabez Leftwich (DR)
 . George Tucker (DR)
 . John Randolph (DR)
 . William S. Archer (DR)
 . Mark Alexander (DR)
 . James Jones (DR)
 . Arthur Smith (DR)
 . Thomas Newton Jr. (DR)
 . Hugh Nelson (DR), until January 14, 1823, vacant thereafter
 . Andrew Stevenson (DR)

Non-voting members 
 . James W. Bates
 . Joseph M. Hernández, from September 30, 1822
 . Solomon Sibley
 . Vacant until statehood

Changes in membership
The count below reflects changes from the beginning of the first session of this Congress.

Senate 

 Replacements: 5
 Democratic-Republicans: no net change
 Federalists: no net change
 Deaths: 2
 Resignations: 6
 Seats of newly admitted states: 2
 Vacancies: 3
 Total seats with changes: 12

|-
| Tennessee(1)
| Vacant
| style="font-size:80%" | Legislature failed to re-elect John Eaton (DR). Late election held.
|  | John Eaton (DR)
| Elected September 27, 1821

|-
| Pennsylvania(1)
| Vacant
| style="font-size:80%" | Seat remained vacant at end of previous Congress
|  | William Findlay (DR)
| Elected December 10, 1821

|-
| Delaware(1)
| Vacant
| style="font-size:80%" | Seat remained vacant at end of previous Congress
|  | Caesar A. Rodney (DR)
| Elected January 24, 1822

|-
| Georgia(2)
|  | Freeman Walker (DR)
| style="font-size:80%" | Resigned August 6, 1821
|  | Nicholas Ware (DR)
| Elected November 10, 1821

|-
| Missouri(1)
| rowspan=2 | New seats
| rowspan=2 style="font-size:80%" | Missouri was admitted to the Union.
|  | Thomas Hart Benton (DR)
| Elected August 10, 1821

|-
| Missouri(3)
|  | David Barton (DR)
| Elected August 10, 1821

|-
| Ohio(3)
|  | William A. Trimble (DR)
| style="font-size:80%" | Died December 13, 1821
|  | Ethan Allen Brown (DR)
| Elected January 3, 1822

|-
| Maryland(1)
|  | William Pinkney (DR)
| style="font-size:80%" | Died February 25, 1822
|  | Samuel Smith (DR)
| Elected December 17, 1822

|-
| Massachusetts(2)
|  | Harrison Gray Otis (F)
| style="font-size:80%" | Resigned May 30, 1822, to run for Mayor of Boston
|  | James Lloyd (F)
| Elected June 5, 1822

|-
| Alabama(3)
|  | John W. Walker (DR)
| style="font-size:80%" | Resigned December 12, 1822, due to failing health
|  | William Kelly (DR)
| Elected December 12, 1822

|-
| Virginia(2)
|  | James Pleasants (DR)
| style="font-size:80%" | Resigned December 15, 1822, after being elected Governor of Virginia
|  | John Taylor (DR)
| Elected December 18, 1822

|-
| Delaware(1)
|  | Caesar A. Rodney (DR)
| style="font-size:80%" | Resigned January 29, 1823, to accept a diplomatic appointment
| Vacant
| Not filled in this Congress
|}

House of Representatives 
 Replacements: 13
 Democratic-Republicans: 1 seat net gain
 Federalists: 1 seat net loss
 Deaths: 5
 Resignations: 15
 Contested election: 2
 Seats of newly admitted states: 1
 Total seats with changes: 23

|-
| 
| Vacant
| style="font-size:80%" | Rep. Henry Hunter Bryan was re-elected but did not take his seat
| Vacant
| 
|-
| 
| Vacant
| style="font-size:80%" | Rep.-elect John C. Wright resigned his seat in the next Congress on March 3, 1821
|  | David Chambers (DR)
| Seated December 3, 1821
|-
| 
| Vacant
| style="font-size:80%" | Rep.-elect James Duncan resigned before Congress met
|  | John Findlay (DR)
| Seated December 12, 1821
|-
| 
| Vacant
| style="font-size:80%" | Rep.-elect William Cox Ellis resigned before Congress met
|  | Thomas Murray Jr. (DR)
| Seated December 12, 1821
|-
| 
| Vacant
| style="font-size:80%" | Credentials for Peter Sharpe were issued by the Secretary of State of New York, but Sharpe never claimed or took the seat, Sharpe's election was contested by Colden, see United States House of Representatives elections in New York, 1821
|  | Cadwallader D. Colden (F)
| Seated December 12, 1821
|-
| 
|  | George Robertson (DR)
| style="font-size:80%" | resigned before Congress met
|  | John S. Smith (DR)
| Seated December 3, 1821
|-
| nowrap | 
| rowspan=2 | Vacant
| rowspan=2 style="font-size:80%" | Missouri was admitted to the Union on August 10, 1821
| rowspan=2  | John Scott (DR)
| rowspan=2 | Seated December 3, 1821
|-
| 
|-
| 
| Vacant
| style="font-size:80%" | Selah Tuthill (DR) was elected after the Congress term had already begun, and died on September 7, 1821, before Congress met. It is uncertain whether credentials were ever issued for Tuthill.
|  | Charles Borland Jr. (DR)
| Seated December 3, 1821
|-
| 
|  | Wingfield Bullock (DR)
| style="font-size:80%" | Died October 13, 1821, before Congress met
|  | James D. Breckinridge (DR)
| Seated January 2, 1822
|-
| 
|  | Solomon Van Rensselaer (F)
| style="font-size:80%" | Resigned January 14, 1822, upon appointment as Postmaster of Albany
|  | Stephen Van Rensselaer (F)
| Seated March 12, 1822
|-
| 
|  | Caesar A. Rodney (DR)
| style="font-size:80%" | Resigned on January 24, 1822, after being elected to the US Senate
|  | Daniel Rodney (F)
| Seated December 2, 1822
|-
| 
|  | Jeremiah Cosden (DR)
| style="font-size:80%" | Cosden's election was contested by Reed
|  | Philip Reed (DR)
| Seated March 19, 1822
|-
| 
|  | William Milnor (F)
| style="font-size:80%" | Resigned on May 8, 1822, to run for Mayor of Philadelphia
|  | Thomas Forrest (F)
| Seated December 2, 1822
|-
| 
|  | Henry Baldwin (DR)
| style="font-size:80%" | Resigned on May 8, 1822
|  | Walter Forward (DR)
| Seated December 2, 1822
|-
| 
|  | James Blair (DR)
| style="font-size:80%" | Resigned on May 8, 1822
|  | John Carter (DR)
| Seated December 11, 1822
|-
| 
|  | William Lowndes (DR)
| style="font-size:80%" | Resigned on May 8, 1822
|  | James Hamilton Jr. (DR)
| Seated January 6, 1823
|-
| 
|  | Samuel Moore (DR)
| style="font-size:80%" | Resigned on May 20, 1822
|  | Samuel D. Ingham (DR)
| Seated December 2, 1822
|-
| 
|  | James Overstreet (DR)
| style="font-size:80%" | Died May 24, 1822
|  | Andrew R. Govan (DR)
| Seated December 4, 1822
|-
| 
|  | Ezekiel Whitman (F)
| style="font-size:80%" | Resigned on June 1, 1822, after becoming a judge of a Court of Common Pleas in Maine
|  | Mark Harris (DR)
| Seated December 2, 1822
|-
| 
|  | William Hendricks (DR)
| style="font-size:80%" | Resigned on July 25, 1822, after his election as Governor of Indiana
|  | Jonathan Jennings (DR)
| Seated December 2, 1822
|-
| 
|  | Thomas Van Swearingen (F)
| style="font-size:80%" | Died on August 19, 1822
|  | James Stephenson (F)
| Seated December 2, 1822
|-
| 
| Vacant
| style="font-size:80%" | Florida Territory was organized on March 30, 1822
| Joseph M. Hernández
| Seated January 3, 1823
|-
| 
|  | Ludwig Worman (F)
| style="font-size:80%" | Died October 17, 1822
|  | Daniel Udree (DR)
| Seated December 23, 1822
|-
| 
|  | Samuel Smith (DR)
| style="font-size:80%" | Resigned on December 17, 1822, after his election to the US Senate
|  | Isaac McKim (DR)
| Seated January 8, 1823
|-
| 
|  | Hugh Nelson (DR)
| style="font-size:80%" | Resigned on January 14, 1823, upon appointment as Minister to Spain
| Vacant
|
|}

Committees
Lists of committees and their party leaders.

Senate

 Amendments to the Constitution (Select) 
 Audit and Control the Contingent Expenses of the Senate (Chairman: James Lanman then Nathaniel Macon)
 Claims (Chairman: Benjamin Ruggles)
 Commerce and Manufactures (Chairman: Mahlon Dickerson)
 Debt Imprisonment Abolition (Select) 
 District of Columbia (Chairman: James Barbour)
 Engrossed Bills (Chairman: James Lanman)
 Finance  (Chairman: John Holmes then Walter Lowrie)
 Foreign Relations (Chairman: Rufus King then James Barbour)
 Indian Affairs (Chairman: Henry Johnson)
 Judiciary (Chairman: William Smith)
 Military Affairs (Chairman: John Williams)
 Militia (Chairman: James Noble)
 National Road from Cumberland to Wheeling (Select) 
 Naval Affairs (Chairman: James Pleasants)
 Pensions (Chairman: James Noble)
 Post Office and Post Roads (Chairman: Montfort Stokes)
 Public Lands (Chairman: Jesse B. Thomas)
 Roads and Canals (Select) 
 Tariff Regulation (Select) 
 Whole

House of Representatives

 Accountability of Public Moneys (Select) 
 Accounts (Chairman: Samuel C. Allen)
 Agriculture (Chairman: Josiah Butler)
 Arkansas Territorial Limits (Select) 
 Claims (Chairman: Lewis Williams)
 Commerce (Chairman: Thomas Newton Jr.)
 District of Columbia (Chairman: Joseph Kent)
 Elections (Chairman: John Sloane)
 Expenditures in the Navy Department (Chairman: Samuel Edwards)
 Expenditures in the Post Office Department (Chairman: George Denison)
 Expenditures in the State Department (Chairman: Silas Wood)
 Expenditures in the Treasury Department (Chairman: Albert H. Tracy)
 Expenditures in the War Department (Chairman: Starling Tucker)
 Expenditures on Public Buildings (Chairman: Hugh Nelson)
 Foreign Affairs (Chairman: Jonathan Russell)
 Indian Affairs (Chairman: Thomas Metcalfe)
 Judiciary (Chairman: John Sergeant then Hugh Nelson)
 Manufactures (Chairman: John Tod)
 Military Affairs (Chairman: William Eustis)
 Naval Affairs (Chairman: Timothy Fuller)
 Pensions and Revolutionary War Claims (Chairman: John Rhea)
 Post Office and Post Roads (Chairman: Francis Johnson) 
 Private Land Claims (Chairman: Samuel Campbell)
 Public Expenditures (Chairman: Thomas Montgomery)
 Public Lands (Chairman: Christopher Rankin)
 Revisal and Unfinished Business (Chairman: Thomas R. Ross)
 Rules (Select) 
 Standards of Official Conduct 
 Ways and Means (Chairman: Samuel Smith)
 Whole

Joint committees

 Enrolled Bills
 The Library

Employees

Legislative branch agency directors 
 Architect of the Capitol: Charles Bulfinch
 Librarian of Congress: George Watterston

Senate 
 Chaplain: William Ryland (Methodist), until December 9, 1822
 Charles P. McIlvaine (Episcopalian), elected December 9, 1822
 Secretary: Charles Cutts
 Sergeant at Arms: Mountjoy Bayly

House of Representatives 
 Chaplain: John Nicholson Campbell (Presbyterian), until December 10, 1821
 Jared Sparks (Unitarian), elected December 10, 1821
 John Brackenridge (Presbyterian), elected December 5, 1822
 Clerk: Thomas Dougherty (died)
 Matthew St. Clair Clarke, elected December 3, 1822
 Doorkeeper: Benjamin Birch, elected December 4, 1821
 Reading Clerks: 
 Sergeant at Arms: Thomas Dunn

See also 
 1820 United States elections (elections leading to this Congress)
 1820 United States presidential election
 1820–21 United States Senate elections
 1820–21 United States House of Representatives elections
 1822 United States elections (elections during this Congress, leading to the next Congress)
 1822–23 United States Senate elections
 1822–23 United States House of Representatives elections

Notes

References

Bibliography

External links
 Statutes at Large, 1789-1875
 Senate Journal, First Forty-three Sessions of Congress
 House Journal, First Forty-three Sessions of Congress
 Biographical Directory of the U.S. Congress
 U.S. House of Representatives: House History
 U.S. Senate: Statistics and Lists